The women's 400 metres hurdles event at the 2002 African Championships in Athletics was held in Radès, Tunisia on August 7.

Results

References

2002 African Championships in Athletics
400 metres hurdles at the African Championships in Athletics
2002 in women's athletics